Samuel Wilbur may refer to:

 Samuel Wilbore (1595–1656), one of the founding settlers of Portsmouth in the Colony of Rhode Island and Providence Plantations
 Samuel Wilbur, Jr. (1622–1697), early settler of Portsmouth in the Colony of Rhode Island and Providence Plantations